The Vienne is a small river in Normandy, France,  in length, It is a right tributary of the Saâne flowing through the department of Seine-Maritime.

Geography 
The Vienne has its source in the Pays de Caux in the territory of the commune of Beauval-en-Caux. Taking a northward journey, it flows through the communes of Saint-Mards, Lamberville, Bacqueville-en-Caux, Hermanville, Lammerville and Thil-Manneville before joining the Saâne at Gueures. 
Like most other rivers in the region, the Vienne is classified as a first class river, offering anglers the chance to catch trout and salmon.

Bibliography 
 Albert Hennetier, Aux sources normandes: Promenade au fil des rivières en Seine-Maritime, Ed. Bertout, Luneray, 2006

See also 
French water management scheme

References

Rivers of France
Rivers of Normandy
Rivers of Seine-Maritime
1Vienne